Lesbian, gay, bisexual, and transgender (LGBT) persons in the U.S. state of Montana may face some legal challenges not experienced by non-LGBT residents. Same-sex sexual activity has been legal in Montana since 1997. Same-sex couples and families headed by same-sex couples are eligible for all of the protections available to opposite-sex married couples, as same-sex marriage has been recognized since November 2014. State statutes do not address discrimination on the basis of sexual orientation and gender identity; however, the U.S. Supreme Court's ruling in Bostock v. Clayton County established that employment discrimination against LGBT people is illegal under federal law. A number of cities also provide protections in housing and public accommodations.

History
Among Native Americans, perceptions towards gender and sexuality were very different from that of the Western world. Among the Blackfeet people, the a'yai-kik-ahsi (literally acts like a woman) are male-bodied individuals who behave, dress, and live as women. Likewise, female-bodied individuals who act and behave as men are known as awau-katsik-saki (literally warrior woman) or ninauh-oskiti-pahpyaki (literally manly-hearted woman). The Gros Ventre, the Cheyenne, the Assiniboine and the Crow refer to male-to-female individuals as athuth, he'émáné'e, wįktą and bate (or badé), respectively, whereas female-to-male people are known as hetanémáné'e among the Cheyenne. The bate would perform domestic tasks (such as cooking and needlework), dress as women and even marry. Osh-Tisch, one of the most famous Crow bate, and others were forced by an American agent in the 1890s to wear male clothes and perform manual labor, to which the other Crows protested "saying it was against [their] nature".

The Montana Territory adopted its first criminal code in 1865. It included a provision prohibiting sodomy ("crime against nature") with five years' to life imprisonment. In 1878, Montana saw one of the earliest recorded sodomy cases in the United States; in Territory v. Mahaffey, a man was convicted of sexual relations with a 14-year-old boy. In 1915, the Montana Supreme Court ruled that fellatio (oral sex), whether heterosexual and homosexual, was also criminal. Over the years, the courts convicted multiple people of sodomy, even consenting adults.

In 1972, the Montana Legislature rejected a proposal that read "private sexual acts between consenting adults do not constitute a crime", by a 69–16 vote. In 1973, a new criminal code was enacted. Sodomy was renamed "deviate sexual conduct", made applicable only to people of the same sex (thus legalizing heterosexual oral and anal sex), and punishable by up to ten years' imprisonment and a possible fine of 50,000 dollars. A 1989 sex offender registration law further required anyone convicted of sodomy to register with the local chief of police and report any change in address.

Legality of same-sex sexual activity
Montana revised its Criminal Code in 1973 and retained its anti-sodomy statute. In 1991, the Montana Legislature made its rape and sexual assault laws gender-neutral, providing for a uniform penalty for both heterosexual and homosexual rape (minimum two years' imprisonment). Attempts to repeal the state's sodomy law failed in 1993 and 1995. In 1997, the Montana Supreme Court held in Gryczan v. State that the state law prohibiting same-sex sexual contact between consenting adults was unconstitutional. Justice James C. Nelson, writing for the 6–1 majority, stated:

Attempts to repeal the statute failed in 1999, 2001 and 2011.

On February 20, 2013, the Montana State Senate passed a bill, by a vote of 38 to 11 vote, that repealed part of the sodomy statute dealing with consenting adults. On April 10, 2013, the Montana House of Representatives passed the bill by a vote of 64 to 35. Governor Steve Bullock signed the legislation into law on April 18.

Recognition of same-sex relationships

A federal court ruled the state's ban on same-sex marriage unconstitutional on November 19, 2014. Judge Brian Morris issued an injunction against the state's enforcement of its ban that took effect immediately. The state's appeal to the Ninth Circuit Court of Appeals was mooted when the U.S. Supreme Court ruled in Obergefell v. Hodges on June 26, 2015 that Ohio's ban on same-sex marriage is unconstitutional, striking down every remaining state ban.

Montana voters had adopted a constitutional amendment in November 2004 that defined marriage as the union of a man and a woman. Similar restrictions appear in the state statutes.

The Montana Supreme Court recognized a common law same-sex marriage as retroactively valid in Adami v. Nelson on December 10, 2019.

Adoption and parenting
Montana permits adoption by individuals, and there are no explicit prohibitions on adoption by same-sex couples or on second-parent adoption. Lesbian couples have access to assisted reproduction services, such as in vitro fertilization. State law recognizes the non-genetic, non-gestational mother as a legal parent to a child born via donor insemination, but only if the parents are married.

Montana law does not regulate the practice of surrogacy, but courts are generally favorable to the process. Generally, courts will grant pre-birth parentage orders to married or unmarried couples and individuals when there is a genetic relationship to the child. The availability of parentage orders to individuals and couples with no genetic link to a child is more often determined on a case-by-case basis. Couples using the traditional surrogacy process may require a post-birth hearing or adoption to obtain legal rights to their child.

In Kulstad v. Maniaci, Barbara Maniaci refused to allow Michelle Kulstad to see the children they had raised together and who had legally been adopted only by Maniaci, but the trial court sided with Kulstad and granted her parental rights. The Montana Supreme Court affirmed this ruling 6–1 on October 7, 2009, setting precedent allowing for future stepparent adoptions by same-sex couples statewide.

Discrimination protections

Montana, by executive order, prohibits discrimination on the bias of sexual orientation and gender identity in state employment and state (sub)contractors. In 2000, Governor Marc Racicot first issued state personnel rules prohibiting discrimination and harassment on the basis of sexual orientation with respect to employment by state government. In November 2008, Governor Brian Schweitzer issued Executive Order No. 41-2008, broadening the government non-discrimination provisions. In January 2016, Governor Steve Bullock expanded the protections to cover gender identity and expanded it to state contractors and subcontractors.

On February 23, 2011, the Montana House of Representatives passed, by a 62–37 vote, a bill that would have prohibited local municipalities from adopting anti-discrimination categories not protected in the state law. The bill died in the Montana State Senate's Standing Committee on April 28, 2011.

The following Montana jurisdictions have ordinances prohibiting discrimination on the basis of sexual orientation and gender identity in both public and private employment, housing and public accommodations: Bozeman, Butte-Silver Bow County, Helena, Missoula, and Whitefish. Missoula County prohibits discrimination against county employees only.

In April 2021, Governor Greg Gianforte signed legislation into law granting people the right to discriminate if their religious beliefs are "substantially burdened". The bill is widely viewed as allowing a "license to discriminate" against LGBT people.

Bostock v. Clayton County

On June 15, 2020, the U.S. Supreme Court ruled in Bostock v. Clayton County, consolidated with Altitude Express, Inc. v. Zarda, and R.G. & G.R. Harris Funeral Homes Inc. v. Equal Employment Opportunity Commission that discrimination in the workplace on the basis of sexual orientation or gender identity is discrimination on the basis of sex, and Title VII therefore protects LGBT employees from discrimination.

Hate crime law
Montana's hate crime statutes do not include sexual orientation or gender identity as protected grounds. Hate crimes committed on the basis of the victim's sexual orientation or gender identity can be prosecuted in federal courts under the Matthew Shepard and James Byrd Jr. Hate Crimes Prevention Act, which was signed into law in October 2009 by President Barack Obama.

Transgender rights

Birth certificates 
Since September 10, 2022, Montana does not allow people to change "identification of sex on birth certificates". A gender marker can only be corrected based on the results of a DNA test or proof of a data entry error. However, this prohibition is not yet enforced. On September 15, a judge blocked Montana from enforcing this law, and a week later, the state Department of Public Health and Human Services agreed to comply with the judge's order. 

On February 22, 2023, a bill was introduced that would prohibit gender marker changes on all identity documents.

Montana has had various rules in the past. Until 2017, Montana required sex reassignment surgery and clinical treatment before updating a person's birth certificate. Then, in December 2017, Montana removed the requirement for surgery. It began allowing transgender individuals to change the gender marker on their birth certificate by submitting to the Department of Public Health and Human Services a "Correction Affidavit" signed by the applicant, a completed "Gender Designation Form" and a certified copy of a court order indicating that the gender has been changed. The Motor Vehicle Division of the Department of Justice would change the sex designation on a driver's license and state ID card upon receipt of a letter from a doctor confirming that the applicant is in the process or has completed the process of changing gender.

In April 2021, the Montana Legislature passed a bill to reintroduce the requirement for “surgical procedures” and obtain a court order. Governor Greg Gianforte signed the bill into law effective immediately. The ACLU sued in federal and state courts in July 2021, claiming that the term “surgical procedure” was vague and that the rule put transgender individuals at risk of harassment, discrimination and violence. In April 2022, a federal judge agreed that the bill had "no clear legal definitions of what sexual reassignment surgery actually means" and blocked its enforcement. Nonetheless, in May 2022, the Department of Public Health and Human Services adopted a "temporary emergency rule" banning birth certificate updates, and the rule was announced as permanent several months later.

Bathrooms 
In June 2018, it was revealed that a conservative initiative to require transgender people to use public bathrooms corresponding to their birth sex had failed to collect the necessary signatures to appear on the ballot.

Sports 
The Montana Legislature passed legislation in April 2021 banning transgender individuals from participating in public school sports and athletics. Governor Gianforte signed the bill into law in May 2021. The bill passed with an amendment stating that if the federal government pulled education funding for Montana, the law would become void. In September 2022, a judge invalidated the Montana law on banning transgender individuals playing sport - due to being against the state constitution.

Sex education parental opt-in
In May 2021, the Montana Legislature and Governor of Montana Greg Gianforte passed, signed and approved a law that requires a "parental opt-in" for K-12 school students within Montana, before sex education can be taught in classrooms.

Public opinion
A 2017 Public Religion Research Institute (PRRI) opinion poll found that 57% of Montana residents supported same-sex marriage, while 37% opposed it and 6% were unsure. Additionally, 61% supported an anti-discrimination law covering sexual orientation and gender identity. 33% were opposed.

Summary table

References

LGBT rights in Montana